Chrysothamnus humilis, called Truckee rabbitbrush, is a North American species of flowering plants in the tribe Astereae within the family Asteraceae. It has been found in northern California, Oregon, Washington, northern Nevada, southwestern Idaho.

Chrysothamnus humilis is a branching shrub up to 30 cm (12 inches) tall with dark gray bark. It has many small, yellow flower heads clumped into dense arrays. The species grows in sagebrush scrub and in sand in desert regions.

References

External links
{http://plants.usda.gov/core/profile?symbol=CHHU2 USDA Plants Profile for Chrysothamnus humilis (Truckee rabbitbrush)]
Calflora Database: Chrysothamnus humilis (Truckee rabbitbrush)
Jepson Manual eFlora treatment of Chrysothamnus humilis

Astereae
Flora of the Northwestern United States
Flora of California
Flora of the Great Basin
Flora of Nevada
Flora of the Sierra Nevada (United States)
Plants described in 1896
Taxa named by Edward Lee Greene
Flora without expected TNC conservation status